Gordon James Brunnen (11 May 1922 – 20 March 2008) was  an Australian rules footballer who played with St Kilda and Fitzroy in the Victorian Football League (VFL).

Prior to playing VFL football, Brunnen served in the Royal Australian Navy during World War II.

Notes

External links 

1922 births
2008 deaths
Australian rules footballers from Victoria (Australia)
St Kilda Football Club players
Fitzroy Football Club players